The statue of David Livingstone in East Princes Street Gardens, Edinburgh, is a 1876 work by Amelia Robertson Hill.

Description
The bronze sculpture depicts David Livingstone wearing a cloak and haversack. He is holding a Bible and has a pistol and compass at his waist. The lion skin represents the time when he survived being attacked by a lion. The statue is next to the Scott Monument.

History
The statue was sculpted by Amelia Robertson Hill between 1875–1876 following Livingstone's death in 1873. It was unveiled on 15 August 1876. On 14 December 1970, the sculpture became a listed building and on 19 December 2002 the sculpture's listed status changed from B to A.

See also
 List of public art in Edinburgh
 1876 in art

References

Buildings and structures in Edinburgh
Outdoor sculptures in Scotland
1876 sculptures
Statues in Scotland
Listed sculptures in Scotland
Category A listed buildings in Edinburgh
Cultural depictions of David Livingstone
Books in art